The women's 4 × 100 metres relay competition at the 2012 Olympic Games in London took place on 9–10 August at the Olympic Stadium. The victorious United States team broke the world record by over half a second.  The previous record had been set 27 years previously by East Germany. The Jamaican team, 6 metres back, missed the previous world record by 0.04, but set a new national record. Another 7 metres back, Ukraine took the bronze, also setting a new national record.

Records
, the existing World and Olympic records were as follows.

The following records were established during the competition:

Results

Round 1

Qual. rule: first 3 of each heat (Q) plus the 2 fastest times (q) qualified.

Heat 1

Heat 2

France originally finished in seventh place with a time of 43.77, but were disqualified due to a lane infringement.

Final
The American team had an often repeated history of relay failures, so most of the pre-race discussion focused on whether it could successfully get the baton around the track. At the 2008 Summer Olympics in Beijing, both the men's and women's 4 × 100 metres teams had dropped the baton, leading one reporter to call it the "nadir in US relay history".

On the first leg of the final, Tianna Madison was able to hold her own against the double 100-metre gold medalist Shelly-Ann Fraser-Pryce.  Allyson Felix put the USA into the lead, extended by Bianca Knight around the turn.  At the final handoff to individual 100-metre silver medalist Carmelita Jeter, the team enjoyed a 3-metre lead. Secure in the handoffs, Jeter sped to the finish, noticing the time and pointing at the clock before the finish line.

Trinidad and Tobago failed to finish as Michelle-Lee Ahye could not pass the baton to Kelly-Ann Baptiste in time.

References

Athletics at the 2012 Summer Olympics
Relay foot races at the Olympics
Olympics 2012
2012 in women's athletics
Women's events at the 2012 Summer Olympics